Route 177 was the shortest state highway recorded in Somerset County, New Jersey and the second shortest around the entire state of New Jersey. Route 177 went for a short,  state-maintained portion of Bridge Street in Somerville. One of only three state highways in Somerset County after the 1953 state highway renumbering, Route 177 was the only one to be decommissioned later on. (The other two highways are Route 27 further south and Route 28 further north) The short-lived designation went from U.S. Route 206 (US 206) in Somerville, up Bridge Street near the Old Cemetery to Fifth Street, where state maintenance terminated. In 1974, the Department of Transportation turned maintenance of this short highway over to the borough of Somerville for future use.

Route description 

Route 177 began at a traffic light intersection with U.S. Route 206 in the city of Somerville. At the intersection, southbound traffic on Route 206 had to use a jughandle to connect to Route 177. The state highway went northeastward, progressing along as South Bridge Street through a curve. Heading northward, the route passed the Somerville Old Cemetery before intersecting with Fifth Street. There, state-maintenance ended, and the designation of Route 177 terminated. Entering downtown Somerville, South Bridge Street continued northward into a large residential community. Passing to the east and west of several residential homes, South Bridge Street continued into the downtown portion, crossing the current-day Raritan Valley Line tracks maintained by New Jersey Transit and served the Somerville train station. After a couple of blocks of residential homes and businesses, South Bridge Street came to an intersection with New Jersey Route 28, where it switched to North Bridge Street.

History 
The alignment of Route 177 was a former alignment of State Highway Route 31 through Somerville. The highway was instated in 1926 as U.S. Route 206 and 1927 as State Highway Route 31 by the New Jersey State Highway Department and the Federal Highway Administration respectively. By 1930, Routes 206 and 31 was shifted off of Bridge Street, running along a partially completed bypass of Somerville. By 1938, this was completed and Route 206 was shifted to the southern terminus of Bridge Street south of the old cemetery. Bridge Street remained unnumbered until the second state highway renumbering on January 1, 1953. That day, the unnumbered alignment became Route 177, running from US 206 to Fifth Street, where it met US 206's former alignment. The route remained intact for a couple of decades, as one of three state highways in Somerset County (along with Route 28 and Route 27) until 1974,  when the route was decommissioned and turned over to the borough of Somerville.

Major intersections

See also

New Jersey Route 160
New Jersey Route 170

References

External links 

177
Transportation in Somerset County, New Jersey